Eric B. Vogel is a clinical psychologist, a professor of psychology, and a game designer.

Career

Professor of Psychology

As a Doctor of Psychology, Vogel was a professor at John F. Kennedy University in Pleasant Hill, California from 2002 to 2021.  Since 2021 he has been a professor in the John F. Kennedy School of Psychology at National University in Pleasant Hill, California. He is the 2009 winner of the Eugene Benjamin Sagan award for Outstanding Teaching in Psychology.

Game Designer

Vogel's game design career began in 2004 with Land of Psymon, a psychotherapeutic game intended to teach children Cognitive behavioral therapy skills by showing them how to defend against psychological monsters ("psymon") that represent negative thinking and common cognitive distortions.

In 2008, with the Cambria board game produced by Sandstorm Productions, Vogel began producing more mass-market releases. To date, his most successful has been The Dresden Files Cooperative Card Game, which raised over a half-a-million dollars in a Kickstarter campaign. This was produced as part of an ongoing partnership with Evil Hat Productions that has resulted in several releases.

In 2010, Vogel designed Armorica, a card game published in June 2010 by Vainglorious Games in English.
Players in Armorica are administrators in the ancient land of Armorica who are trying to convince wealthy Romans to support them and give them prestige. In Armorica, there are two decks of cards, the Gauls and the Romans.  Some of the deck is flipped up for plfyers to choose from. Every player starts with a card and then play proceeds clockwise with players taking a Gaul card and placing it in front of them.   Players compete for special Roman cards. The goal is to build sets of diverse colors.  The larger a player's sets, the greater their prestige. Play ends when the either of the decks are exhausted. A review from Roll the Dice stated that it was a "nice simple card game to play at the end of the evening".

References

External links
 

Card games introduced in 2010
Board games about history
Armorica
Board game designers
Living people
Year of birth missing (living people)
John F. Kennedy University faculty